Lüthi und Blanc is a Swiss German language television drama serial (soap opera) of the 1990s and 2000s. It was filmed and produced at locations in Switzerland by Schweizer Radio und Fernsehen SRF.

Cast and characters (inclompete)

Plot (excerpt) 
The various plot lines are about the fate of families around the stubborn chocolate factory-owner Jean-Jacques Blanc (Hans Heinz Moser), his wife Johanna (Linda Geiser), whose daughter Catherine (Isabelle von Siebenthal) and her son, and Catherine's husband Martin Lüthi (Hans Schenker). Opponent of the Lüthi and Blanc-clans and "villain" of the series is the opaque, scheming bankers and illegitimate son of J.J. Blanc, Michael Frick (Gilles Tschudi). The serial focusses on locations in Zürich and Sainte-Croix, the location of the fictional chocolate factory J. J. Blanc.

In addition to the places where the characters live and work, the locations include the "Calvados Bar" in Zurich-Wiedikon, which is run by Martin Lüthi's mother Lilian (Renate Steiger) and his half-sister Maja (Tonia Maria Zindel) and her husband Steve Meier (Martin Schenkel and Roeland Wiesnekker respectively), various shared flats and a farm in the Zurich province. In addition, there are the fictional restaurants "De la Poste" in Sainte-Croix and "Balthasar" in Zurich, which serve as meeting places.

Other important characters are the widowed, scheming gossip reporter Lisbeth Rohner (Esther Gemsch), her brother-in-law, the hypocritical-seeming pastor Ulrich Rohner (René Schoenenberger); street sweeper and "Calvados" regular Willi (Beat Schlatter); the son of the Lüthi couple and young lawyer Thomas (Benjamin Fueter), his sister Julia (Stefanie Stämpfli) and Thomas' ex-girlfriend Lotta Waser (Viola Tami). The popular actor Mathias Gnädinger can be seen in the role of the farmer Ruedi Egger. It should be noted, of course, that the constellations of characters and settings have changed considerably in some cases during the more than 200 episodes that have been broadcast.

At the beginning, the series was conceived as a cross-language project; the series also ran in dubbed versions on the SRG stations TSR and TSI. In addition to the locations in the German and French-speaking parts of Switzerland, there was also a plot location in Ticino. This concept failed, however, and Lüthi und Blanc was continued as a purely Swiss-German project. What remained was the occasional bilingualism of the series. Although the main characters usually speak German with each other, French is often spoken in conversations with outsiders in Vaud, even in the dialect version.

The series sometimes touches on controversial topics such as open homosexuality, racism, drug abuse, prostitution, celibacy, incest or polygamy. The often very different social milieus portrayed are striking.

Production 
Lüthi und Blanc was shot at locations in the Canton of Vaud and in Zürich, and produced in Glattfelden.

Around 80 % of the scenes were shot in a studio set up especially for the soap in Glattfelden. There were over 30 sets for the series in the former spinning mill. Among the most famous were the "Villa Blanc" and the "Calvados Bar", which exists in real life in Zurich and was recreated in a slightly modified form in the studio. The exterior views were shot all over Switzerland, for example in Estavayer-le-Lac (Villa Blanc) or Embrach (farm).

The smaller part, about 20 % of all scenes, were shot "on location". The Lüthi and Blanc crew spent about four weeks a year filming in Switzerland.

The filming was not open to the public, but it was possible to visit the Glattfelden Film Studios - an opportunity taken advantage of by several thousand visitors each year.

The series was shot up to nine months in advance of broadcast. In addition, the scripts were written half a year in advance. Filming was done in so-called sub-sets, which were assigned to a director.

Reception 
As well as Fascht e Familie, Lüthi & Blanc is still very popular in the Swiss German culture, and from time to time re-broadcast in the Swiss German television. Lüthi and Blanc was by the Swiss media often called Schoggi Soap (chocolate soap).

References

External links 
 

1999 Swiss television series debuts
2007 Swiss television series endings
1990s Swiss television series
2000s Swiss television series
Swiss television series
German-language television shows
Television series about dysfunctional families
Television shows set in Switzerland
Films shot in Zürich
Schweizer Radio und Fernsehen original programming